A provider-independent address space (PI) is a block of  IP addresses assigned by a regional Internet registry (RIR) directly to an end-user organization. The user must contract with a local Internet registry (LIR) through an Internet service provider to obtain routing of the address block within the Internet.

Provider-independent addresses offer end-users the opportunity to change service providers without renumbering of their networks and to use multiple access providers in a multi-homed configuration. However, provider-independent blocks may increase the burden on global routers, as the opportunity for efficient route aggregation through Classless Inter-Domain Routing (CIDR) may not exist.

IPv4 assignments
One of the RIRs is RIPE NCC. The RIPE NCC can no longer assign IPv4 Provider Independent (PI) address space as it is now using the last  of IPv4 address space that it holds. IPv4 address space from this last  is allocated according to section 5.1 of "IPv4 Address Allocation and Assignment Policies for the RIPE NCC Service Region". IPv4 Provider-aggregatable (PA) Address space
can only be allocated to RIPE NCC members.

IPv6 assignments
In April 2009 RIPE accepted a policy proposal of January 2006 to assign IPv6 provider-independent IPv6 prefixes. Assignments are taken from the address range  and have a minimum size of a  prefix.

See also
 Multihoming

References

Network addressing
IP addresses